"When I Fall in Love" is a popular song, written by Victor Young (music) and Edward Heyman (lyrics). It was introduced in the film One Minute to Zero as the instrumental titled "Theme from One Minute to Zero". Jeri Southern sang on the first vocal recording released in April 1952 with the song's composer, Victor Young, handling the arranging and conducting duties. The song has become a standard, with many artists recording it; the first hit version was sung by Doris Day released in July 1952.

Day's recording was made on June 5, 1952. It was released by Columbia Records as catalog number 39786 and issued with the flip side "Take Me in Your Arms". The song reached number 20 on the Billboard chart.

A 1996 recording by Natalie Cole, sung as a duet with her father Nat King Cole using vocals from his 1956 version, won 1996 Grammys for Best Pop Collaboration with Vocals and Best Instrumental Arrangement with Accompanying Vocal(s).

Notable recordings

 A version was recorded by Nat King Cole on December 28, 1956. It was issued by Capitol Records on the album titled Love Is the Thing, catalog number SW824. The song was also used in the 1957 film Istanbul, in which Cole sang the song. The single was released in the UK in 1957 and reached No. 2 on the UK Singles Chart. This recording was rereleased in 1987 and reached number 4. The start of Cole's version was sampled in Pop Will Eat Itself's 1988 single "There Is No Love Between Us Anymore". Since 2014, Cole's version of the song has been featured in adverts for SSE.
 Natalie Cole recorded two different versions of the song: a contemporary R&B/smooth jazz version for her 1987 album Everlasting (No. 14 U.S. AC) and a more traditional version for her 1996 Stardust album as a virtual duet with her father Nat King Cole, including recordings of his vocals from his 1956 version. This version won two awards at the 39th Grammy Awards: Best Pop Collaboration with Vocals and Best Instrumental Arrangement with Accompanying Vocal(s) for arrangers Alan Broadbent and David Foster.
 Johnny Mathis recorded the song for his 1959 album Open Fire, Two Guitars, which charted in the UK and many other countries.
 Blues singer Etta Jones released a version of the song in 1960, which spent eight weeks on the Billboard Hot 100, reaching No. 65.
 A version by the Lettermen was released as a single in 1961 and spent 14 weeks on the Billboard Hot 100, reaching No. 7, while reaching No. 1 on the Billboards Easy Listening chart.  Veteran drummer Earl Palmer played on this version.
 Donny Osmond recorded the song in 1973 for his album A Time for Us. It spent 13 weeks on the Billboard Hot 100, reaching No. 55, while reaching No. 4 on the UK Singles Chart and No. 1 in France.
 In 1984, Linda Ronstadt released the song as the lead track on her album Lush Life and as a single. Ronstadt's version reached No. 24 on Billboards Adult Contemporary chart.
 Van Morrison quoted the song extensively in his 1993 medley rendition of "It's All in the Game", which appears on his live album A Night in San Francisco.

Rick Astley version

The version of "When I Fall in Love" by English singer-songwriter Rick Astley was released on November 30, 1987, coinciding with the 30th anniversary of the release of Nat King Cole's version of the song. This single is mainly remembered for a closely fought contest for UK Christmas number one. Rivals EMI, hoping to see their act, Pet Shop Boys, reach number one with "Always on My Mind", re-released the version by Nat King Cole. This led to a slow down of purchases of Astley's version, allowing Pet Shop Boys to reach the coveted top spot. Despite selling over 250,000 copies and gaining a Silver certification from the BPI, it peaked in the UK at number 2 for two weeks. The re-release by Nat King Cole reached number 4. Since the single was released as a double A-side, the other half of the single was "My Arms Keep Missing You", which was successful in its own right in Europe.

In 2019, Astley recorded and released a "Reimagined" version of the song for his album The Best of Me, which features a new piano arrangement.

Track listing
 CD single
 "When I Fall In Love" – 3:03
 "My Arms Keep Missing You" (The No L Mix) – 6:48
 "My Arms Keep Missing You" (Dub) – 4:58

 7" single
 "My Arms Keep Missing You" ("Where's Harry?" remix) – 3:14
 "When I Fall In Love" – 3:03

 12" maxi and single
 "When I Fall In Love" – 3:00
 "My Arms Keep Missing You" (Dub) – 6:04
 "My Arms Keep Missing You" (The No L Mix) – 6:43

Charts

Celine Dion and Clive Griffin version

The cover version of "When I Fall in Love" by Canadian singer Celine Dion and British singer Clive Griffin was featured in the 1993 romantic comedy Sleepless in Seattle, starring Tom Hanks and Meg Ryan, and released as a single in July same year. The song was recorded expressly for the soundtrack and was originally intended as a duet between Dion and Stevie Wonder, but according to Dion when she heard the demo performed by Warren Wiebe she preferred that would be her duet with Wiebe. It was nominated for a Grammy Award for Best Pop Performance by a Duo or Group with Vocal in 1994, and won a Grammy Award for Best Instrumental Arrangement Accompanying Vocalist(s). The award went to David Foster and Jeremy Lubbock. The song appears on both, the Sleepless in Seattle soundtrack (number one on the Billboard 200 and 4× Platinum RIAA certification for selling over 4 million copies in the US), and later on Dion's album The Colour of My Love, released in November 1993. The accompanying music video was directed by Dominic Orlando in Hollywood, Los Angeles.

Critical reception
AllMusic senior editor Stephen Thomas Erlewine remarked that Dion's album, The Colour of My Love, which featured the song, had "careful production, professional songwriting (highlighted by "When I Fall in Love", "The Power of Love", and "Think Twice"). J.D. Considine from The Baltimore Sun wrote that "it's no accident that Celine Dion keeps recording all those movie-theme duets -- she's got the perfect voice for wide-screen romance, all unbridled power and telegraphed emotion." He added that "she sounds great, demonstrating the kind of vocal confidence that originally made Whitney Houston a star." Larry Flick from Billboard felt that Dion "is at home within an arrangement of delicate rhythms and sweeping orchestration", while also noting that Griffin's voice "is a pure thrill." Christopher Smith of Talk About Pop Music said that the singers "do credible justice to Nat’s signature tune as she remains in subdued and romantic mood for the entire length" of the song.

Commercial performance
"When I Fall in Love" reached top forty in several countries, including number 21 in Canada, number 22 in New Zealand, number 23 in the United States, and number 37 in the Netherlands. It was popular on the Canadian Adult Contemporary chart and the US Hot Adult Contemporary Tracks, peaking at numbers two and six, respectively.

Live performances
Dion performed "When I Fall in Love" during her The Colour of My Love Tour, Falling Into You Around the World Tour and Millenium Concert in Montreal in 1999. In 1998, Anne Murray performed "When I Fall in Love" with Dion live and included it on her DVD called An Intimate Evening with Anne Murray...Live. Later, this version appeared on Murray's 2007 album Anne Murray Duets: Friends & Legends.

Formats and track listings
Australian/European CD, Japanese 3", US 7" and cassette single
"When I Fall in Love" (Celine Dion and Clive Griffin) – 4:20
"If I Were You" (Celine Dion) – 5:07

European CD maxi-single
"When I Fall in Love" (Celine Dion and Clive Griffin) – 4:20
"If You Asked Me To" (Celine Dion) – 3:55
"An Affair to Remember" (Marc Shaiman) – 2:30

Credits and Personnel 

 Performed by – Celine Dion & Clive Griffin
 Produced by – David Foster
 Keyboards & Synthesizers – David Foster
 Arranged by – David Foster, Jeremy Lubbock
 Drum Programming – David Foster
 Minimoog Bass – David Foster
 Orchestrated by – Jeremy Lubbock
 Conducted by – Jeremy Lubbock
 Engineering – Humberto Gatica
 Mixing – Humberto Gatica

Charts

Weekly charts

Year-end charts

Release history

See also
Grammy Award for Best Arrangement, Instrumental and Vocals
List of Billboard Middle-Road Singles number ones of 1962

References

External links

1952 songs
1952 singles
1961 singles
1987 singles
1993 singles
Anne Murray songs
Barry Manilow songs
Carmen McRae songs
Celine Dion songs
Julio Iglesias songs
Linda Ronstadt songs
Little Willie Littlefield songs
Nat King Cole songs
Rick Astley songs
The Carpenters songs
The Lettermen songs
Tom Jones (singer) songs
Songs with music by Victor Young
Songs with lyrics by Edward Heyman
Song recordings produced by Stock Aitken Waterman
Song recordings produced by David Foster
Grammy Award for Best Instrumental Arrangement Accompanying Vocalist(s)
Grammy Award for Best Pop Collaboration with Vocals
Pop ballads
Pop standards
Male–female vocal duets
Number-one singles in France
Columbia Records singles
Capitol Records singles
RCA Records singles
Epic Records singles
Decca Records singles